Lin Youyi (born Iriana Halim;  11 October 1980), is a Singaporean television host, current affairs presenter, and an actress. She began her career as a radio DJ before being signed to Mediacorp as a television presenter in 2008, after which she went into acting and hosting on television programmes. Youyi was awarded the Best Current Affairs Presenter award for Good Morning Singapore at Star Awards 2012. She is currently one of the anchors for Hello Singapore on Mediacorp Channel 8.

Early life
Youyi was born in Hong Kong, raised in Taiwan and Singapore. Her father is an Indonesian and her mother Vietnamese of Chinese descent. Youyi has a sister, Julina Halim, a behavioural coach.

Youyi spent her childhood in Taipei, where she completed her elementary studies. She had then relocated, spending her adolescent years in Singapore, where she completed her high school at Chung Cheng High School and tertiary education in Temasek Junior College, and eventually pursuing a bachelor's degree in accountancy at Nanyang Technological University in 2003. In 2008, Youyi decided to pursue her second university degree in translation and interpretation at SIM University (now Singapore University of Social Sciences) and was awarded the bronze award for academic excellence in "SPH Awards of Excellence".

Career
Youyi had an interest in the radio industry, and signed up for the DJ Hunt audition organised by radio station YES 933 while in junior college. She came in as the first runner-up in the competition to Lim Peifen but decided to complete her university education after A' Levels.

In 2003, Youyi signed up for a radio DJ audition organised by JIA 883 before she graduated from Nanyang Technological University, and won a full-time contract as a presenter on radio at JIA 883. During her career in the radio industry, she hosted the morning and evening drive time programmes on radio, before being invited to audition for a television presenter role in 2008.

Youyi made her television debut in 2008 on Mediacorp TV's Channel 8, as a current affairs presenter for Good Morning Singapore. She is currently one of the anchor hosts for Channel 8's evening prime time current affairs programme Hello Singapore. She pocketed her first TV award, Best Current Affairs Presenter award, at the Star Awards 2012. She was nominated for Best Info-Ed Programme Host at the Star Awards in 2014 and 2015.

She has hosted live shows and events such as Community Chest TV Charity Shows in 2011, 2013 and 2014, and hosted Chingay Parade Singapore 5 times between 2013 and 2018. She is frequently hosts programmes on Channel 8 and Channel U, particularly travelogues, which has attained high viewership ratings on Channel U. She was one of the "Most Popular Female Artist" nominees in the Star Awards in 2016.

Apart from hosting, Youyi was introduced into acting and was cast in various drama series, movies and even in stage plays between 2007 and 2016, when she was one of the female leads in Crescendo the Musical. She also played the role of "Xiu Zhen" in the 2016 drama series Hero.

In 2017, Youyi decided not to renew her full-time artist contract with Mediacorp, which ended in June that year, to assist her sister, Julina in her business.

In addition to television and radio presentation, Youyi also presents a live video programme on Facebook, namely Youyi Live, where she interviews business owners and entrepreneurs, as well as other public personalities and celebrities.

Personal life 
Youyi was married from 2013 to 2014, the couple together both ran the now-defunct Outpost No 903 Gastrobar from May 2012 to December 2013.

Filmography

Television

Hosting
2008: Good Morning Singapore 早安您好
2011: ComChest TrueHearts 2011公益献爱心
2012: Starry Starry Night 2012 美好的一天-第四届中国新加坡大型歌会
2012: The Right One (TesTube实验室) 非你莫属
2012: Smart @ Work 上班不留白
2013: Hair Challenge 101 Series 8 护发动员101
2013: Silver Carnival 5 银色嘉年华5
2013: Smart @Work 2 上班不留白 2
2013: Chingay 2013 妆艺大游行 2013
2013: SPD Charity Show 2013 真情无障爱
2014: Hello Singapore 狮城有约
2014: ComChest Care & Share Charity Show 爱分享分享爱
2014: Where to Stay 到底住哪里
2014: Hair Challenge 101 Series 9 护发挑战101
2014: Silver Carnival 6 银色嘉年华6
2014: Silver Carnival 7 银色嘉年华7
2014: Silver Carnival 8 银色嘉年华8
2014: Star Awards 20 Walk of Fame 红星大奖20之星光大道
2014: Small Steps Big Future 小脚印,大志向
2014: Chingay 2014 妆艺大游行2014
2014: Lunar New Year Eve Show Special 2014 骏马奔腾喜迎春
2014: My Heartland Carnival 邻邻艺计划
2015: Voice of China 4 中国好声音第四季新加坡招募总决赛
2015: Silver Carnival 9 银色嘉年华 9
2015: Silver Carnival 10 银色嘉年华 10
2015: Hair Challenge 101 Series 10 护发挑战 101
2015: Smart @Work 3 上班不留白
2016: Chingay 2016 妆艺大游行2016
2017: Let's Go Dating 我们去相亲
2017: Chingay 2017 妆艺大游行2017

Film

Stage

Awards and nominations

References

External links

Living people
Singaporean people of Chinese descent
Singaporean people of Indonesian descent
Singaporean people of Hoa descent
Hong Kong emigrants to Singapore
Singaporean film actresses
Singaporean television actresses
21st-century Singaporean actresses
21st-century Hong Kong actresses
Hong Kong film actresses
Hong Kong people of Indonesian descent
Hong Kong people of Hoa descent
Indonesian people of Chinese descent
Temasek Junior College alumni
1980 births
Singaporean television presenters
Hong Kong television presenters
Singaporean women television presenters
Hong Kong women television presenters
Singaporean women radio presenters
Hong Kong radio presenters
Hong Kong women radio presenters